Chaotica is a commercial fractal art editor and renderer extending flam3 and Apophysis's functionality. There is also a free version with limited render resolution and animation length.

History

Chaotica began as a personal project of Thomas Ludwig in the deviant Art fractal community in 2010, but has since been handed over to Glare Technologies, the developers of Indigo Renderer.

Features
Chaotica implements a generalized iterated function system and features a modern rendering engine based on advanced algorithms not found in open-source IFS implementations. It has an animation editor, selective randomization of parameters, and imaging controls such as different anti-aliasing modes and RGB-channel response curves.

Sample images

See also

References

External links
 Official Website

Fractals
Fractal software
Graphics software
Windows software
MacOS software
Linux software